Ines Reingold-Tali, known by her stage names Inéz, Inèz or Inez, is an Estonian  new media artist, musician, composer   and writer  on sound art, noise, electronic music, glitch and digital culture. She lives and works in Finland. Since the mid-1990s she has belonged to a new generation of composers in Finland interested in experimental interdisciplinary art projects and electronic music. Her repertoire includes electroacoustic chamber music, experimental, electronic and film music. She has been engaged in commissioned projects in the fields of electroacoustic, contemporary chamber music and experimental music, in different audiovisual art projects, video art, poetry, performance, theater, short films and radio-art. Her compositions have been broadcast internationally on various radio stations and television channels in many European countries, Australia, Canada and the USA. Her works have been published on solo-albums and international compilations by various labels, incl. K-tel International, FG Music/Naxos, YOCOMA, YAP and Charm of Sound. She has been nominated to participate in various international festivals, exhibitions and conferences, Florence Biennale (Biennale Internazionale dell’arte Contemporânea di Firenze) 2007  in Italy, LACDA International Juried Competition Winners Show (award) at the Los Angeles Center for Digital Art  in USA 2007, 30e Festival International des Musiques Syntheses 2000 in France and international conferences on musicology, among others.

Ines Reingold-Tali is also a media theoretician with a focus on noise and glitch aesthetics, digital art, postdigitalism, visual music, immersive art experience and intuition in the context of creative art and composition process.

Selected discography

Solo albums
Inez: Déjà vu (CD YAP Records) 2015
Ines Reingold-Tali: Oceano, computer animation art, (DVD, YOCOMA) 2008  
Ines Reingold-Tali: Suction, audiovisual art, (DVD, YOCOMA) 2007 
Ines Tali-Reingold: Meta-Rendez-vous (CD YAP Records) 2006
Ines Reingold: Passione d´Amore (CD FG Music- Naxos) 1995

Compilations
Energy of Visions 1999 (K-tel International)
Sounds! 1999 (Charm of Sound)
X-tato-holic, compilation album Energy Xtravadance 1998  (NRJ Radio & K-tel International).

Selected works
 Audiovisual installation in Galerie Gora, Montréal QC Canada, 2009  
 Audiovisual installation in the LUШIÉRΞ FESTIVAL, III Rassegna Internazionale di Video Arte&Digital Cultures, international video art selection, curator: Dores Sacquegna, Primo Piano LivinGallery, Lecce, Italy, 12/20/2008 - 12/24/2008, 
 Audiovisual installation Suction, Caos e limiti della sua rappresentazione, La sesta dimensione e l`infinita possibilità dell’ uomo, Primo Piano LivinGallery, Lecce, Italy,  October 2008 
 Audiovisual installation and digital paintings, Biennale Internazionale dell’Arte Contemporanea di Firenze, Italy, 2007
 Digital Paintings at LACDA International Juried Art Competition Winners Show, Los Angeles Center For Digital Art, CA, United States, 2007

Commissioned works
Audiovisual installation Oceano on FogScreen(2011) Science Center Ahhaa (Estonia)
Video Art and Abstract Animations s.p.e.c.t.r.o-e.n.e.r.g.y (2008), FogScreen Collection (Finland) 
Q.res@Pirator (2000) 30e Festival International des Musiques Synthèse, Institut International de Musique Electroacoustique de Bourges (France)
Energy of Visions (1999), compilation album, commissioned by K-tel International
Meta-Rendez-vous (1999), composition for chamber orchestra, electronics, piano, bass singer, female and male voices, 17 min., commissioned by Finnish Broadcasting Company Yleisradio (Finland)
Film score & music for the film A Sense of Loss (1997), directed by Timo Humaloja

References

Sources

Interviews
 Interview in Selvis-lehti 02/1999

Biography
 Kuvataiteilijat (Fine Artists of Finland), Kustannus Oy Taide, 2004.
 Catalogue Biennale Internazionale dell’Arte Contemporanea di Firenze, 2007. p. 612.

Reviews
 Il caos e la sua rappresentazione,Italy
 Radford, Laurie 2000. Sounds! CD review. Computer Music Journal, Winter 2000, Vol. 24, No. 4, 64-65.

External links
 Ines Reingold-Tali article
 TMK: Ines Reingold-Tali sound art’ist ja muusikast
 Ines Reingold-Tali: art
 Register of the Artists' Association of Finland: Ines Reingold-Tali: Biography
 III Rassegna Internazionale di Video Arte -Lumière, curated by Dores Sacquegna
 Donne in musica: biographies european women composer
 Index Scriptorum Estoniae

Living people
Estonian musicians
Estonian artists
Experimental composers
Experimental musicians
Avant-garde composers
Sound artists
Women sound artists
Musique concrète
Women classical composers
20th-century composers
Estonian women artists
Year of birth missing (living people)
20th-century Estonian musicians
21st-century Estonian musicians
21st-century women musicians
20th-century women composers